Charles Sydney Smith (26 January 1879 – 6 April 1951) was born in Wigan, the ninth of eleven children born to Thomas Smith and Elizabeth née Sayer. He was a British water polo player who competed as goalkeeper for the England Water Polo team which won gold medals in the London games of 1908, and the Stockholm games of 1912. After the Great War he returned, at the age of 44, as part of the Great Britain team to win a third gold medal at the Antwerp games in 1920. He was still in the team four years later competing in the Paris games of 1924 where the team was knocked out in the first round by the Hungarian team after extra time.

Smith is the oldest water polo player to compete at the Olympics. On 13 July 1924, he played his last match at the age of 45 years and 169 days in the Paris Olympics. Smith is also the oldest Olympic gold medalist in water polo. At the age of 41 years and 216 days, he won the third Olympic gold medal on 29 August 1920. Smith is one of ten male athletes who won three Olympic gold medals in water polo.

Smith was chosen to represent the country as the flag bearer at the 1912 Summer Olympics in Stockholm, Sweden. This made him the first competing athlete to carry the flag for Great Britain, and the first water polo player to be a flag bearer at the opening and closing ceremonies of the Olympics.

See also
 Great Britain men's Olympic water polo team records and statistics
 List of multiple Olympic gold medalists in one event
 List of Olympic champions in men's water polo
 List of Olympic medalists in water polo (men)
 List of players who have appeared in multiple men's Olympic water polo tournaments
 List of men's Olympic water polo tournament goalkeepers
 List of flag bearers for Great Britain at the Olympics
 List of members of the International Swimming Hall of Fame

References

External links

 

1870s births
1951 deaths
Water polo goalkeepers
English male water polo players
Water polo players at the 1908 Summer Olympics
Water polo players at the 1912 Summer Olympics
Water polo players at the 1920 Summer Olympics
Water polo players at the 1924 Summer Olympics
Olympic water polo players of Great Britain
English Olympic medallists
Olympic gold medallists for Great Britain
Sportspeople from Wigan
Olympic medalists in water polo
Medalists at the 1920 Summer Olympics
Medalists at the 1912 Summer Olympics
Medalists at the 1908 Summer Olympics